Karen Anne Carpenter (March 2, 1950 – February 4, 1983) was an American singer and drummer, who formed half of the sibling duo the Carpenters alongside her older brother Richard. With a distinctive three-octave contralto range, she was praised by her peers for her vocal skills. Carpenter's struggle with and eventual death of heart failure related to her years-long struggle with anorexia would later raise awareness of eating disorders and body dysmorphia and their possible causes.

Carpenter was born in New Haven, Connecticut, and moved to Downey, California in 1963 with her family. She began to study the drums in high school and joined the Long Beach State choir after graduating. After several years of touring and recording, the Carpenters were signed to A&M Records in 1969, achieving enormous commercial and critical success throughout the 1970s. Initially, Carpenter was the band's full-time drummer, but she gradually took the role of frontwoman as her drumming was reduced to a handful of live showcases or tracks on albums. From then on she found her appearance under constant scrutiny and developed anorexia as a way to cope with the massive pressure to look slim on stage.

At the age of 32, Carpenter died of heart failure due to complications from anorexia nervosa, which was little-known outside celebrity circles at the time, and her death led to increased visibility and awareness of eating disorders. Interest in her life and death has spawned numerous documentaries and movies. Carpenter's work continues to attract praise, including appearing on Rolling Stones 2010 list of the 100 greatest singers of all time.

Early life
Karen Anne Carpenter was born on March 2, 1950, at Grace New Haven Hospital (now called Yale New Haven Hospital) in New Haven, Connecticut, the daughter of Agnes Reuwer (née Tatum, March 5, 1915 – November 10, 1996) and Harold Bertram Carpenter (November 8, 1908 – October 15, 1988). Harold was born in Wuzhou, China, where his parents were missionaries. Before finding work in the printing business, he was educated at boarding schools in England.

Carpenter's only sibling, Richard, the elder by three years, developed an interest in music at an early age, becoming a piano prodigy. Karen's first words were "bye-bye" and "stop it", the latter spoken in response to Richard. She enjoyed dancing and by age four was enrolled in tap dancing and ballet classes; later on, she liked to play softball on the street.

The family moved in June 1963 to the Los Angeles suburb of Downey, after Harold was offered a job there by a former business associate. Carpenter entered Downey High School in 1964 at age 14 and was a year younger than her classmates. She joined the school marching band, initially to avoid exercising for gym classes. Bruce Gifford, the conductor (who had previously taught her brother), gave her the glockenspiel, an instrument she disliked, and after admiring the performance of her friend and classmate, drummer Frankie Chavez (who had been playing from an early age and idolized jazz drummer Buddy Rich), she asked if she could play those instead. Carpenter wanted a Ludwig drum set because it was used by her favorite drummers, Joe Morello and Ringo Starr. Chavez persuaded her family to buy her a $300 (the equivalent of $ in ) Ludwig kit, and he began to show her how to play. Her enthusiasm for drumming led to teaching herself how to play complicated lines and studying stick control, drum styles, playing technique, and grips like traditional and matched grip. Carpenter began to study drum technique with Bill Douglass, a well-respected jazz drummer with Benny Goodman and Art Tatum, and soon after she acquired a professional drum kit.

Carpenter was initially nervous about performing in public, but said she "was too involved in the music to worry about it". She graduated from Downey High School in the spring of 1967, receiving the John Philip Sousa Band Award, and enrolled as a music major at Long Beach State, where she performed in the college choir with Richard. Karen subsequently became more confident in singing and began to take lessons with Frank Pooler, the choir's director. She worked with him on developing the upper register so she would have a full three-octave range and he taught her a mixture of classical and pop singing. Pooler later said "Karen was a born pop singer". By age 17, her voice "was a remarkable instrument".

Career

Early years 
The first public performance of Karen and Richard was in a local production of Frank Loesser's musical Guys and Dolls. Carpenter's first band was Two Plus Two, an all-girl trio formed with friends from Downey High. They split up after one of the mothers refused to give her daughter permission to attend their first gig. In 1965, Karen, Richard, and his college friend Wes Jacobs, a bassist and tuba player, formed the Dick Carpenter Trio. The band rehearsed daily, played jazz in nightclubs, Richard later told he was impressed with his sister's musical talent, saying that she would "speedily maneuver the sticks as if she had been born in a drum factory". She did not sing at this point; instead, singer Margaret Shanor guested on some numbers. The trio signed a contract with RCA Records and recorded two instrumentals, but they were not released.

In April 1966, the Carpenters were invited to audition at a session with bassist Joe Osborn, well known for being part of the studio-musician collective the Wrecking Crew. Though she was initially expected to just be the drummer, Karen tried singing and impressed everyone there with her distinctive voice. Osborn signed a recording contract with her for his label, Magic Lamp Records; he was not particularly interested in Richard's involvement.

In 1967, Jacobs left the trio to study at the Juilliard School, and the Carpenter siblings were keen to try out other musical styles. Along with other musicians, including Gary Sims and John Bettis, the siblings formed the group Spectrum, which focused on a harmonious vocal sound and recorded many demo tapes in Osborn's garage studio, working out how to overdub voices onto multitrack tape. Many of those tapes were rejected by record companies. The group had difficulty attracting a live following, as their sound was too dissimilar from the hard rock and psychedelic rock then popular in clubs.

In 1968, the Dick Carpenter Trio also appeared on the TV talent show Your All American College Show, performing Dancing in the Street with Carpenter playing the drums and singing. The Trio did win the finals that year.

Carpenters

A&M Records finally signed the Carpenters to a recording contract in 1969. Karen started out as both the group's drummer and co-lead singer, and she originally sang all of her vocals from behind the drum set. She sang most of the songs on the band's first album, Offering (later retitled Ticket to Ride); her brother wrote ten of the album's thirteen songs and sang on five of them. The opening and concluding tracks were sung by both siblings in unison. As well as drumming, Karen played bass guitar on two songs, "All of My Life" and "Eve", under Osborn's guidance. On "All I Can Do", she played in 5/4 time, while "Your Wonderful Parade" featured multiple snare and bass drum overdubs to emulate the sound of a marching band. The track "Ticket to Ride", a Beatles song that later became the album's title track, was released as the Carpenters' first single; it reached No. 54 on the Billboard Hot 100. Their next album, 1970's Close to You, featured two hit singles: "(They Long to Be) Close to You" and "We've Only Just Begun". They peaked at No. 1 and No. 2, respectively, on the Hot 100.

After reviews complained that the group had no focal point in live shows, Richard and manager Sherwin Bash persuaded her to stand at the microphone to sing the band's hits while another musician played the drums (former Disney Mouseketeer Cubby O'Brien served as the band's other drummer for many years). She initially struggled in live performances singing solo, as she felt more secure behind the drum kit. After the release of Now & Then in 1973, the albums tended to have Carpenter singing more and drumming less, and she did become the focal point of all records and live performances; Bash said "she was the one that people watched". Starting with the Carpenters' 1976 concert tour and continuing thereafter, she would perform a showcase in which she moved around the stage playing various configurations of drums. Her studio performances benefited from close miking that captured the nuances of her voice well. Though she had a three-octave range, many of the duo's hits prominently feature her lower contralto singing, leading her to quip, "The money's in the basement."

Carpenter always considered herself a "drummer who sang". She preferred Ludwig Drums, including the Ludwig SuperSensitive snare, which she favored greatly. However, she did not drum on every Carpenters recording. She was the only featured drummer on Ticket to Ride and on Now & Then, except for "Jambalaya". According to Hal Blaine, Karen played on many of the album cuts and he played on most of the Carpenters' studio sessions when she did not play drums herself, but Karen was informed about Blaine's involvement and she approved on the basis that she and Richard wanted hit singles. The duo were happy for Blaine to take the role in the studio, as he was a respected session musician and it was easier to record Carpenter's guide vocal without it spilling onto the drum mics. Blaine complimented Karen's drumming skills, but believed her greatest strength was as a vocalist and thought himself more adept at working in a recording studio, which required a different approach from that of an onstage performance. On Made in America, Karen provided percussion on "Those Good Old Dreams" in tandem with Paulinho da Costa, and played drums on the song "When It's Gone (It's Just Gone)" in unison with Larrie Londin.

In the mid-1970s, Richard Carpenter developed an addiction to Quaaludes. The Carpenters frequently canceled tour dates, and they stopped touring altogether after their September 4, 1978, concert at the MGM Grand in Las Vegas. In 1980, Karen performed a medley of standards in a duet with Ella Fitzgerald on the Carpenters' television program Music, Music, Music. In 1981, after release of the Made in America album (which turned out to be their last), the Carpenters returned to the stage and went on some promotional tours, including an appearance for the BBC program Nationwide.

"Now" was the last song Carpenter recorded, in April 1982. Though Richard was concerned about her health, he still thought her voice sounded as good as ever.

Solo
Carpenter released her first solo record, "Looking for Love" / "I'll Be Yours", in 1967 on Osborn's Magic Lamp label. Only 500 copies were pressed, and the label folded shortly afterwards. In 1979, while Richard took a year off to treat his addiction, Karen started recording in New York for a solo album with producer Phil Ramone. The sessions produced music that was different from the usual Carpenters material, tending more toward disco and up-tempo numbers, with more mature lyrics and taking full advantage of Karen's upper vocal register.

Although Ramone never produced an album deemed unworthy of release, the album met with a tepid response from Richard and A&M executives in early 1980 and was shelved by A&M Records co-owner Herb Alpert, in spite of attempts by world-renowned producer Quincy Jones to convince him to release the solo record after a remix. A&M subsequently charged Carpenter $400,000 to cover the cost of recording her unreleased album, to be paid out of the duo's future royalties.

A portion of the solo album was commercially released in 1989, when some of its tracks as Richard's remixes were included on the album Lovelines, the final album of previously unreleased material from the Carpenters. Not until 1996 was the complete solo album, titled Karen Carpenter, finally released as originally intended.  Rob Hoerburger wrote in The New York Times that it may not have been the album to define Karen Carpenter's career, "but it holds up with anything that like-minded singers – Streisand, Newton-John – were recording at the time".

Personal life
Carpenter had a complicated relationship with her parents. They had hoped that Richard's musical talents would be recognized and that he would enter the music business but were not prepared for Karen's success. She continued to live with them until 1974. In 1976, Carpenter bought two Century City apartments that she combined into one; the doorbell chimed the opening notes of "We've Only Just Begun". She collected Disney memorabilia and liked to play softball and baseball. Growing up, she had played baseball with other children on the street and was picked before her brother for games. She studied baseball statistics carefully and became a fan of the New York Yankees. In the early 1970s, she became the pitcher on a celebrity all-star softball team.

Petula Clark, Olivia Newton-John, and Dionne Warwick were her celebrity friends. While she was enjoying success as a female drummer in what was primarily an all-male occupation, Carpenter's ideas were not in line with the women's liberation movement, saying she felt a wife should cook for her husband because men were not good at cooking and that when married, this was what she planned to do.

In early interviews, Carpenter showed no interest in marriage or dating, believing that a relationship would not survive constant touring, adding "as long as we're on the road most of the time, I will never marry". In 1976, she said the music business made it hard to meet people and that she refused to just marry someone for the sake of it. Carpenter admitted to Olivia Newton-John that she longed for a happy marriage and family. She later dated several notable men, including Mike Curb, Tony Danza, Terry Ellis, Mark Harmon, Steve Martin, and Alan Osmond. After a whirlwind romance, she married real-estate developer Thomas James Burris on August 31, 1980, in the Crystal Room of The Beverly Hills Hotel. Burris, divorced with an 18-year-old son, was nine years her senior. A few days prior to the ceremony, Karen was taped singing a new song, "Because We Are in Love", and the tape was played for guests during the wedding ceremony. The song, written by her brother and John Bettis, was released in 1981. The couple settled in Newport Beach.

Carpenter desperately wanted children, but Burris had undergone a vasectomy without telling her before the marriage had been arranged and refused to get an operation to reverse it. Their marriage did not survive this disagreement and ended after 14 months. Burris was living beyond his means, borrowing up to $50,000 (the equivalent of $ in ) at a time from his wife, to the point where reportedly she had only stocks and bonds left. Carpenter's friends also indicated he was impatient. Karen Kamon, a close friend, recounted an incident in which she and Carpenter went to their normal hangout, Hamburger Hamlet, and Carpenter appeared to be distant emotionally, sitting not at their regular table but in the dark, wearing large dark sunglasses, unable to eat and crying. According to Kamon, the marriage was "the straw that broke the camel's back. It was absolutely the worst thing that could have ever happened to her."

In September 1981, Carpenter revised her will and left her marital home and its contents to Burris, but left everything else to her brother and parents, including her fortune estimated at 5–10 million dollars (between $ and $ in ). Two months later, following an argument after a family dinner in a restaurant, Carpenter and Burris broke up. Carpenter filed for divorce on October 28, 1982, while she was in Lenox Hill Hospital.

Health and death
Carpenter began dieting while in high school. Under a doctor's guidance, she began the Stillman diet, eating lean foods, drinking eight glasses of water a day, and avoiding fatty foods. That year, she saw a concert photo of herself in which she thought her outfit made her appear heavy. She hired a personal trainer, who advised her to change her diet. The new diet built muscle, which made her feel heavier instead of slimmer. Carpenter fired the trainer and began her own weight-loss program using exercise equipment and counting calories. Her eating habits also changed around this time; she would try to remove food from her plate by offering tastes to others with whom she was dining.

At live performances, fans reacted with gasps to her gaunt appearance, and many wrote to the pair to ask what was wrong. She refused to declare publicly that she was in ill health; in a 1981 Nationwide TV-interview, when asked point blank about anorexia, she simply said she was "pooped". She, however, knew there was something wrong and so did everyone around her. Dionne Warwick writes about a lunch with Carpenter in New York, 1981: "It was shocking to see how very thin she was". In an interview after Karen's death, Richard said he was aware that Karen was unhealthily dieting from around 1975. He stated he and his parents did not know how to help her. In 1981, she told Richard that there was a problem and that she needed help with it. Carpenter spoke with Cherry Boone, who had recovered from anorexia, and contacted Boone's doctor for help. She was hoping to find a quick solution to her problem, as she had performing and recording obligations, but the doctor told her treatment could take from one to three years. She then chose to be treated in New York City by psychotherapist Steven Levenkron, supported by Phil Ramone's wife.

By late 1981, Carpenter was using thyroid replacement medication, which she obtained using the name of Karen Burris, to increase her metabolism. She used the medication in conjunction with increased consumption of the laxatives (up to 80–90 tablets per night) upon which she had long relied, which caused food to pass quickly through her digestive tract. Despite Levenkron's treatment, including confiscation of medications that Karen had misused, her condition continued to deteriorate, and she lost more weight. Carpenter told Levenkron that she felt dizzy and that her heart was beating irregularly. Finally, in September 1982, she was admitted to Lenox Hill Hospital in New York, where she was placed on intravenous parenteral nutrition. The procedure was successful, and she gained some weight in a relatively short time, but this put a strain on her heart, which was already weak from years of anorexic behaviors. She maintained a relatively stable weight for the rest of her life.

Carpenter returned to California in November 1982, determined to reinvigorate her career, finalize her divorce and begin a new album with Richard. On December 17, 1982, she gave her last singing performance in the multi-purpose room of the Buckley School in Sherman Oaks, California, singing Christmas carols for her godchildren, their classmates and other friends. On January 11, 1983, she made her last public appearance at a gathering of past Grammy Award winners, who were commemorating the awards show's 25th anniversary. She seemed somewhat frail and worn out, but according to Dionne Warwick, was vibrant and outgoing, exclaiming, "Look at me! I've got an ass!" She had also begun to write songs after returning to California and told Warwick that she had "a lot of living left to do.”

On February 1, 1983, Carpenter saw her brother for the last time and discussed new plans for the Carpenters and for resumed touring. Three days later, on February 4, Carpenter was scheduled to sign final papers making her divorce official. Shortly after waking up on that day, she collapsed at her parents' home in Downey. Paramedics found her heart beating once every 10 seconds (6 bpm). Carpenter was pronounced dead at Downey Community Hospital at 9:51 a.m. She was only 32 years old.

Carpenter's funeral was held on February 8, 1983, at Downey United Methodist Church. Approximately one thousand mourners attended, including her friends Dorothy Hamill, Olivia Newton-John, Petula Clark, and Dionne Warwick. Her estranged husband, Thomas Burris, also attended and placed his wedding ring into her casket. Carpenter was buried at the Forest Lawn Memorial Park in Cypress, California. In 2003, her body was moved along with those of her parents to a private mausoleum at the Pierce Brothers Valley Oaks Memorial Park in Westlake Village, California.

An autopsy, released on March 11, 1983, ruled out drug overdose, attributing death "emetine cardiotoxicity due to or as a consequence of anorexia nervosa". Carpenter was discovered to have a blood sugar level of 1,110 milligrams per deciliter, more than ten times the average. Two years later, the coroner told colleagues that Carpenter's heart failure was caused by repeated use of ipecac syrup, an over-the-counter emetic often used to induce vomiting in cases of overdosing or poisoning. This claim was disputed by Levenkron, who said that he had never known her to use ipecac and that he had not seen evidence that she had been vomiting. Carpenter's friends were convinced that she had abused laxatives and thyroid medication to maintain her low body weight and thought this problem had started after her marriage began to crumble.

Legacy and cultural impact 

Carpenter's singing has attracted critical praise and influenced several significant musicians and singers, including Madonna, Sheryl Crow, Pat Metheny, Sonic Youth's Kim Gordon, Shania Twain, Natalie Imbruglia, and k.d. lang. Paul McCartney has said that she had "the best female voice in the world: melodic, tuneful and distinctive". She has been called "one of the greatest voices of our lifetime" by Elton John. In the BBC documentary Only Yesterday: The Carpenters Story, her friend Nicky Chinn said that John Lennon walked up to her at a Los Angeles restaurant and told her "I want to tell you, love, that you've got a fabulous voice." Her drumming has been praised by fellow musicians Hal Blaine, Cubby O'Brien and Buddy Rich and by Modern Drummer magazine. In 1975, she was voted the best rock drummer in a poll of Playboy readers, beating Led Zeppelin's John Bonham.

On October 12, 1983, shortly after her death, the Carpenters received a star on the Hollywood Walk of Fame. In 1999, VH1 ranked Carpenter at No. 29 on its list of the 100 Greatest Women of Rock and Roll. In 2010, Rolling Stone ranked Carpenter No. 94 on its list of the 100 Greatest Singers of All Time, calling her voice "impossibly lush and almost shockingly intimate", adding "even the sappiest songs sound like she was staring directly into your eyes".

Carpenter's death brought media attention to conditions such as anorexia nervosa; the condition had not been widely known beforehand. Her family started the Karen A. Carpenter Memorial Foundation, which raised money for research on anorexia nervosa and other eating disorders.

Carpenter is known to fans as "Lead Sister". This originated from a mispronunciation of "lead singer" by a Japanese journalist in 1974, and she later wore a T-shirt with the nickname during live shows.

Biographies 
A 43-minute film titled Superstar: The Karen Carpenter Story, directed by Todd Haynes, was released in 1987, and featured Barbie dolls as the characters. It was withdrawn from circulation in 1990 after Haynes lost a copyright infringement lawsuit filed by Richard Carpenter. The film's title is derived from the Carpenters' 1971 hit song "Superstar". Over the years, it has developed into a cult film and was included in Entertainment Weeklys 2003 list of the top 50 cult movies.

On January 1, 1989, the similarly titled made-for-TV movie The Karen Carpenter Story aired on CBS with Cynthia Gibb in the title role. Gibb lip-synched the songs to Carpenter's recorded voice, with the exception of "The End of the World". Both films use the song "This Masquerade" in the background while showing Carpenter's marriage to Burris. The movie helped revive the Carpenters' critical standing and increased their music's popularity.

Richard Carpenter helped in the production of the documentaries Close to You: Remembering The Carpenters (1997) and Only Yesterday: The Carpenters Story (2007). The made-for-TV movie Karen Carpenter: Goodbye to Love (2016) was written and directed by John Holdsworth and featured British actress Adele Keating as Karen.

Randy Schmidt wrote a biography about Carpenter entitled Little Girl Blue, published in 2010, which included a foreword by Warwick. It provides a different perspective than those of the other officially endorsed biographies, and it was based on interviews with other friends and associates. The New York Times said that the book was "one of the saddest tales in pop". Schmidt's next work about Karen would be "Carpenters: An Illustrated Discography" in 2019, featuring interviews with a variety of people well-versed in the duo's musical history.

In 2021, long-time Carpenters historian Chris May and Associated Press entertainment journalist Mike Cidoni Lennox published Carpenters: The Musical Legacy, based on interviews with Richard Carpenter. It features rare photographs and newly revealed stories behind the making of the albums. Goldmine said the book "provided a candid and detailed look at much of what went into the Carpenters sound as well as Richard's personal thoughts on the music business today".

Discography

Studio albums

 Offering (later reissued as Ticket to Ride) (1969)
 Close to You (1970)
 Carpenters (1971)
 A Song for You (1972)
 Now & Then (1973)
 Horizon (1975)
 A Kind of Hush (1976)
 Passage (1977)
 Christmas Portrait (1978)
 Made in America (1981)

Posthumous albums

 Voice of the Heart (1983)
 An Old-Fashioned Christmas (1984)
 Lovelines (1989)
 As Time Goes By (2001–2004)

Solo albums
 Karen Carpenter (1996), recorded 1979-1980

Solo singles
"Looking for Love" (1966)
"If I Had You" (1989)
"Make Believe It's Your First Time" (1996)

Movies and documentaries 

 The Karen Carpenter Story (1989 TV movie), Joseph Sargent

References

Notes

Citations

Sources

Further reading
 McKay, George (2018). "Skinny blues: Karen Carpenter, anorexia nervosa and popular music". Popular Music 37(1): 1–21.

External links
 Richard and Karen Carpenter – Official site
 
 

The Carpenters members
1950 births
1983 deaths
A&M Records artists
American contraltos
American women drummers
American women pop singers
American women rock singers
American jazz drummers
American pop rock singers
American women record producers
American soft rock musicians
Ballad musicians
Burials at Valley Oaks Memorial Park
Deaths from anorexia nervosa
Musicians from Downey, California
Musicians from New Haven, Connecticut
Neurological disease deaths in California
Record producers from California
Singers from California
20th-century American drummers
20th-century American singers
20th-century American women singers
Jazz musicians from California